The number of extant works ascribed to Jayatirtha are 22 in number with one non-extant work associated with him, 18 of which are commentaries on the works of the 13th century Hindu philosopher and theologian, Madhvacharya. He also crafted few but significant independent treatises dealing with the epistemology of Dvaita philosophy and refutation of the ontological aspects of Advaita. His precise and lucid style of writing earned him the distinction of Tikacharya or commentator par-excellence. His works were heavily commented upon by subsequent Dvaita philosophers like Vyasatirtha, Vijayendra Tirtha, Vadiraja Tirtha, Raghuttama Tirtha, Raghavendra Tirtha and Satyanatha Tirtha.

Commentaries on the works of Madhvacharya

Independent works

References

Bibliography

External links 
 Biographical sketch of Jayatirtha and his works

Jayatirtha works